The men's 1500 metres middle-distance event at the 1932 Summer Olympics took place on August 3 and August 4 at the Los Angeles Memorial Coliseum. Twenty-four athletes from 14 nations competed. The 1930 Olympic Congress in Berlin had reduced the limit from 4 athletes per NOC to 3 athletes. The event was won by Luigi Beccali of Italy, earning the nation's first medal in the 1500 metres. Canada also won its first 1500 metres medal, with Phil Edwards's bronze.

Background

This was the ninth appearance of the event, which is one of 12 athletics events to have been held at every Summer Olympics. Despite the low attendance in 1932 generally, the 1500 metres had a strong field. Returning finalists from 1928 were Finland's medalists, gold winner Harri Larva and bronze winner Eino Purje, along with sixth-place finisher Paul Martin of Switzerland. Other top runners included Jack Lovelock of New Zealand, Luigi Beccali of Italy, Glenn Cunningham of the United States, and Phil Edwards of Canada.

Brazil and New Zealand each made their first appearance in the event. The United States made its ninth appearance, the only nation to have competed in the men's 1500 metres at each Games to that point.

Competition format

The competition consisted of two rounds, the format used since 1908. With fewer runners than in previous Games, the number of semifinals was reduced to three (with between 7 and 9 runners each after withdrawals). The top four runners in each heat advanced to the final, maintaining the 12-man final race.

Records

These were the standing world and Olympic records (in minutes) prior to the 1932 Summer Olympics.

In the final Luigi Beccali set a new Olympic record at 3:51.2.

Schedule

Results

Semifinals
Three heats were held; the fastest four runners from each heat advanced to the final round.

Semifinal 1

Semifinal 2

Semifinal 3

Final

References

Athletics at the 1932 Summer Olympics
1500 metres at the Olympics
Men's events at the 1932 Summer Olympics